Nikolay Mylnikov may refer to:
Nikolay Mylnikov (painter), Russian painter
Nikolai Vladimirovich Mylnikov (born 1977), Russian footballer